Currawarna is a rural community in the central east part of the Riverina.  It is situated by road, about 6 kilometres north west of Millwood and 32 kilometres south of Coolamon.  At the 2016 census, Currawarna had a population of 189 people.

The place name Currawarna is derived from the Wiradjuri aboriginal language meaning "pine tree".

Currawarna Post Office opened on 1 August 1899 and closed in 1979.

Notes and references

External links

Towns in the Riverina
Towns in New South Wales
Populated places on the Murrumbidgee River